Kasamh Se (English title: The Promise) was an Indian soap opera produced by Ekta Kapoor of Balaji Telefilms. The show aired on Zee TV from 16 January 2006 to 12 March 2009. The story is about three sisters: Bani, Piya and Rano. It was remade in Malayalam as Vrindavanam. Initially the show was launched on May 7, 2012 on Asianet in its prime time slot. the show was moved to another Malayalam TV channel and a rival of Asianet and Surya TV. Vrindavanam is currently aired on Surya TV every weekday i.e., from Monday to Friday. It was originally named Vrindavanam when it used to be aired in Asianet. But its name was changed from Vrindavanam to Nandanam, and its telecasting had been shifted from Asianet to Surya TV.

Plot
Three Dixit sisters; Bani, Pia and Rano are different but are close to each other. They live in Mount Abu. After their father's death, the three sisters go to Mumbai to live with Jai Udai Walia, a ruthless business tycoon who knew their parents. Jai falls for Pia, but she loves Jai's employee Pushkar Shukla and is more interested in Jai's wealth. Their marriage is arranged but on the wedding day, Pia elopes with Pushkar. To save the Dixit family's honor and mostly persuaded by Jai's cunning sister Jigyasa, Bani takes Pia's place at the altar and marries Jai. Jai is initially furious, but slowly comes to fall for Bani. They kiss after a family function arranged by Jai’s friend Roshni. Jai's younger nephew and Jigyasa's younger son Sahil falls for Rano and they get married.

Though Pia is married to Pushkar, after an argument with Pushkar she becomes interested in Jai's wealth and tries to steal him from Bani. Once Jai goes on a business trip, Pia follows him, spikes his drink, and sexually assaults him. This leaves Jai shaken.

On Bani and Jai's one-year anniversary, it is revealed that Pia is pregnant with Jai's child. Bani goes into trauma but later forgives them. Pia gives birth to a son, Veer while Rano gives birth a son, Varun. Sahil is killed and Pia frames Bani for Sahil's death and blackmails Jai: he can either let Bani spend life in jail or testify that she is mentally ill and she can spend only five years in a mental hospital. Jai, who is left with no option, rules that Bani is mentally ill and she is sent to a mental hospital.

At the hospital, she gives birth to twins Krishna and Atharva but they are taken away by Jai. Bani escapes from the hospital and is rescued by a man named Aparajit Deb who takes her under his wing. He takes an interest in her. He offers her to come with him abroad so she can get away from her past. Bani agrees but promises that she will return for her children.

5 years later

Krishna and Atharva are now five years old. Pia does not take care of them. Bani, who has adopted the name Durga Dasgupta, returns to take her children and exposes Pia for what she has done and take revenge against Jai. Later she learns that Jai has done nothing and he testified against her only to save her. Pia is thrown out of the house. Pia meets with an accident and is left in a wheelchair. Bani and Rano forgive her and help her.

It is revealed that Bani had a twin sister Anamika and she is dead. Her husband Daksh Randheria became mentally unstable after that. He only acts normal when he is with Bani. Krishna and Atharva are kidnapped and murdered in front of Bani and Jai. Struck by the loss of his children and instigation by Jigyasa, Jai kicks Bani out of the house. Jai's aunt supports Bani and leaves the house. Bani, feeling like she has nothing left, tries to kill herself but is saved. She is revealed to be pregnant and finds hope in her life again. Daksh is cured.

5 years later

Bani lives by the name of Maithili with Jai's aunt and her 5-year-old daughter Ganga in Meerut. Daksh is helping Bani. Jai has moved on and made his business flourish. He has remarried to Meera Khandelwal. Jai meets Ganga and has a good connection with her, not knowing that Ganga is his daughter. Later he learns that Ganga is his daughter. Ganga is revealed to have blood cancer and the only way she can survive is by a bone marrow transplant that can only be donated by family. This makes Jai and Bani come together to save Ganga. Jai learns the truth that Bani was never having an affair with Daksh and apologizes to her. Jigyasa is revealed to have gotten the Walia twins kidnapped. Jai sends Jigyasa to jail but Bani does not believe that Jigyasa killed them. Jigyasa is taking the blame for the murder because the actual killer has blackmailed her that they would kill Jigyasa's elder son Ranbir if she didn't take the blame.

Bani gives birth to another set of twins, who are named after Krishna and Atharva. Ganga undergoes surgery and is cured. Daksh finds out who killed the twins but before he can reveal it, he is murdered. The family takes a trip to Bani's maternal home in Mount Abu. Pia is revealed to be fine and had been pretending to be handicapped to save Bani because the real killer is one of their family members. Pushkar takes Pia and Veer with him. It is revealed that Krishna and Atharva's killer is Meera. Meera confesses her crimes to Bani and sets Bani on fire. Bani falls off a cliff, burning, into the lake. She is declared dead, which leaves Jai and the family devastated.

Bani is revealed to be alive. She is saved by a man named Partho Mitra. She loses her memory and her face is severely damaged. She gets a new face with plastic surgery. Partho adopts her and moves to Kolkata with her.

16 years later
Bani and Jai's children, Krishna and Ganga are grown up. Bani lives as Pronita Mitra and has hazy nightmares of the night Meera tried to kill her. Soon, she meets Jai in Mount Abu but Jai does not recognize her because of her new face. She also completes Ganga's painting in a painting exhibition. Bani is invited to a party at the Walia mansion where she sees Meera and regains her memory. She vows to take down Meera. She learns that Meera has spoilt her children and her own son. She exposes Meera in front of Jai. Meera accepts all the allegations and tells Jai the truth that she spoilt his children because Ganga and Krishna are Bani's daughters and if he divorced her she will claim her share in the property. Jai and Bani decide to teach her a lesson. Jai pretends to apologize to Meera and asks for their second marriage. Jai and Bani trick Meera into signing divorce papers and Bani sits in the mandap and they marry. They also teach their children a lesson. Jai and Meera's son also learns about Meera's truth and disowns her. It is revealed that Partho had been working with Jigyasa and Jigyasa was the one who saved her when Meera tried to kill her 16 years ago.

Meera tries to ruin Ganga's life by having her marry Pratyush Mittal. Mittals are bankrupt and Pratyush is pretending to be in love with Ganga. Bani learns about it and with the help of Ganga's friend Rishi Tyagi and her hired actress Sonali expose Pratyush and Mittal family on the day of marriage. The Mittal family is arrested and Rishi who had fallen in love with Ganga makes a proposal in front of Walia family of marrying Ganga. Ganga initially refuses but later agrees. They then marry. Bani tries to scare Meera pretending to be Bani's ghost/spirit/soul. Meera learns that Bani is alive and tries to kill her. Bani is saved by Jigyasa. Jai stops Meera from attacking Jigyasa. He is so furious that he tries to kill Meera but he is stopped by Walia family. Meera is exposed and sent to jail. Jigyasa reunites with her family. Jigyasa lies to Walia family that she had hired Pronita to expose Meera. Rano and Pia come to know that Pronita is actually Bani and with help of Pushkar prove that Pronita is actually Bani. Ganga falls in love with Rishi. Jai and Pia's son Veer comes to Mumbai. He is unaware of Jai, Bani, Pia's past because he is raised by Pia and Pushkar. He thinks Pushkar is his father. When he learns about Jai, Bani, and Pia's past, he, after Jigyasa's instigation, starts planning and plotting against Bani. Jigyasa then creates a rift between Jai and Meera's son Vicky and Ganga, and due to this stress, Jai has a heart attack and is paralyzed. The Walia family then make peace and Jigyasa apologizes to Bani for everything.

1 year later
The family has relocated to Mount Abu, Bani and Jai come to their family during the festival of Holi and they celebrate with the whole family. Jai is completely well. The three sisters talk about how they started their journey here in Mount Abu, they are happy together with their family and all ends well.

Cast

Main
 Prachi Desai / Gurdeep Kohli as 
 Bani Dixit Walia – Nishikant and Kiran's eldest daughter; Anamika, Piya and Rano's sister; Jai's wife; Krishna, Atharva, Ganga, Jr. Krishna and Jr. Atharva's mother (2006–2009)
 Anamika Dixit Randheria – Nishikant and Kiran's second daughter; Bani, Piya and Rano's sister; Daksh's wife (2007) (dead)
 Pronita Mitra (Fake after plastic surgery)
 Ram Kapoor as Jai Walia – Udai's son; Jigyasa's brother; Nachiket's half-brother; Bani's husband; Meera's ex-husband; Veer, Krishna, Atharva, Ganga, Krishna, Jr. Atharva, Jr. Krishna, and Vicky's father (2006–2009) 
 Roshni Chopra / Manasi Varma as Piya Dixit Shukla – Nishikant and Kiran's third daughter; Bani, Anamika and Rano's sister; Pushkar's wife; Veer's mother (2006–2009)
 Arunima Sharma / Pallavi Purohit as Rano Dixit Bali – Nishikant and Kiran's youngest daughter; Bani, Anamika and Piya's sister; Sahil's widow; Varun's mother (2006–2009)
 Jaya Bhattacharya / Ashwini Kalsekar as Jigyasa Walia Bali – Udai's daughter; Jai's sister; Nachiket's half-sister; Aditya's wife; Ranbir, Sahil and Anu's mother (2006–2009)

Recurring
 Siddharth Vasudev as Ranbir Bali – Jigyasa and Aditya's elder son; Sahil and Anu's brother; Rashi's husband; Vidya's father (2006–2008)
 Prashant Ranyal as Sahil Bali – Jigyasa and Aditya's younger son; Ranbir and Anu's brother; Rano's husband; Varun's father (2006–2007) (dead)
 Naman Shaw as Pushkar Shukla – Jai's employee; Mahesh's brother; Piya's husband; Veer's adoptive father (2006–2008) (dead)
 Swati Anand as Rashi Chopra Bali – Ranvijay's daughter; Rohit's sister; Ranbir's wife; Vidya's mother (2006–2009)
 Manoj Joshi as Nishikant Dixit – Kiran's husband; Bani, Anamika, Piya and Rano's father (2006) (dead)
 Anuradha Rajyadhyaksha as Kiran Dixit – Nishikant's wife; Bani, Anamika, Piya and Rano's mother (2006) (dead)
 Nigaar Khan as Barnali Walia – Udai's second wife; Nachiket's mother; Jai and Jigyasa's stepmother (2006)
 Mayank Gandhi as Veer Pushkar Shukla – Piya's son and Pushkar's adoptive son (2008-2009)
 Mayank Sharma as Nachiket "Natwar" Walia – Udai and Barnali's son; Jai and Jigyasa's half-brother (2006–2007)
 Pawan Shankar as Tarun Sablok – Jai's friend; Bani's lawyer (2006-2007)
 Jatin Sial / Bakul Thakkar as Aditya Bali – Jai's best friend; Jigyasa's husband; Ranbir, Sahil and Anu's father (2006–2008)
 Dilnaaz Shroff as Anu Bali Chopra – Jigyasa and Aditya's daughter; Ranbir and Sahil's sister; Rohit's wife; Nihita's mother (2006)
 Karan Patel / Saurabh Raj Jain as Rohit Chopra – Ranvijay's son; Rashi's brother; Anu's husband; Jigyasa and Aditya's son-in-law; Nihita's father (2006)
 Sudha Shivpuri as Dadi (Mrs. Bali) – Aditya's mother; Jigyasa's mother-in-law; Ranbir, Sahil and Anu's grandmother (2006–2009)
 Pallavi Subhash as Meera Khandelwal Walia – Mohan's sister; Jai's ex-wife; Vicky's mother; Krishna and Atharva's murderer (2007–2008)
 Kamal Sadanah as Mohan Khandelwal – a Businessman; Jai's friend later brother-in-law; Meera's brother (2006)
 Seema Bhargav as Billo – Karuna's mother; Jai and Jigyasa's aunt; Laxmi's grandmother (2006–2008)
 Rakshanda Khan as Roshni Chopra – Jai's ex-girlfriend; Ranvijay's sister; Rohit and Rashi's aunt (2006)
 Shabbir Ahluwalia as Sandeep Sikand aka Rock Star Sandy (2006)
 Kushal Punjabi as Lawyer
 Eijaz Khan as Anupam Kapadia
 Suvarna Jha / Priya Arya as Karuna Makhija – Billo's daughter; Laxmi's mother (2007) 
 Preeti Amin as Laxmi Makhija – Karuna's daughter (2008)
 Ronit Roy as Aparajit Deb – A vengeful business tycoon; Bani's helper (2007)
 Sumona Chakravarti as Nivedita Deb – Aparajit's sister (2007)
 Karan Hukku as Daksh Randheria – Anamika's widower (2007–2008) (dead)
 Atharva Dhanorkar as Atharva Walia – Bani and Jai's elder son; Krishna, Ganga, Jr. Krishna and Jr. Atharva's brother; Veer and Vicky's half-brother (2007) (dead)
 Diya Sonecha as Krishna Walia – Bani and Jai's eldest daughter; Atharva, Ganga, Jr. Krishna and Jr. Atharva's sister; Veer and Vicky's half-sister (2007) (dead)
 Priya Bathija as Ganga Walia Tyagi – Bani and Jai's second daughter; Krishna, Atharva, Jr. Krishna and Jr. Atharva's sister; Veer and Vicky's half-sister; Rishi's wife (2008–2009)
 Ahsaas Channa as Child Ganga Walia (2007–2008)
 Vishal Singh as Rishi Tyagi – Ganga's husband; Jai and Bani's son-in-law (2008-2009)
 Akshita Kapoor as Jr. Krishna Walia – Bani and Jai's youngest daughter; Krishna, Atharva, Ganga and Jr. Atharva's sister; Veer and Vicky's half-sister (2008–2009)
 Unknown as Jr. Atharva Walia – Bani and Jai's younger son; Krishna, Atharva, Ganga and Jr. Krishna's brother; Veer and Vicky's half-brother (2008) (missing)
 Priya Marathe as Vidya Bali – Ranbir and Rashi's daughter (2008–2009)
 Navika Kotia as Child Vidya Bali (2007–2008)
 Gautam Gulati as Varun Bali – Rano and Sahil's son (2008–2009)
 Vivian Dsena as Vicky Walia – Jai and Meera's son; Veer, Krishna, Atharva, Ganga, Jr. Krishna and Jr. Atharva's half-brother (2008–2009)
 Himanshu Tiwari as Veer Walia – Piya and Jai's son; Pushkar's adoptive son; Krishna, Atharva, Ganga, Jr. Krishna, Jr. Atharva and Vicky's half-brother (2007)
 Shailendra Singh as Partho Mitra – Jigyasa's partner; Pronita's father; Bani's father-figure (2008)
 Utkarsha Naik as Sarla Shukla
 Kishwer Merchant as Seema Shukla – Mahesh's wife (2006)
 Amita Chandekar as Sonali – Jai's ex-girlfriend (2006)
 Anita Hassanandani as Mrs. Anupam Kapadia
 Neha Bam as Mrs. Mittal – Pratyush's mother (2008)
 Ajay Trehan as Mr. Mittal – Pratyush's father (2008)
 Lily Patel as Dadi's friend
 Anjali Mukhi as Mrs. Chopra – Ranvijay's wife; Rohit and Rashi's mother
 Roopal Tyagi as Rhea
 Sanaya Irani as Geet
 Karan Wahi as Pradeep

Special appearances
 Rajshree Thakur as Saloni Nahar Singh - Invited to Rano's and Sahil's wedding
 Sharad Malhotra as Sagar Pratap Singh (Episode 252) (Integration episode with Banoo Main Teri Dulhann)
 Divyanka Tripathi as Vidya Sagar Singh (Episode 252) (Integration episode with Banoo Main Teri Dulhann)
 Hiten Tejwani as Anupam Kapadia (Episode 515)
 Gauri Pradhan Tejwani as Mrs. Anupam Kapadia (Episode 515)
 Sanjay Dutt as ACP Shamsher S. Khan: To promote his film Shootout at Lokhandwala
 Suniel Shetty as Inspector Kavi Raj Patil:To promote his film Shootout at Lokhandwala

Awards

References

External links
 

Balaji Telefilms television series
Zee TV original programming
Indian television soap operas
2006 Indian television series debuts
2009 Indian television series endings